The Ihawu Field Engineer Regiment (formerly 3 Field Engineer Regiment) is a reserve engineer regiment of the South African Army.

History

Origin
3 Field Engineer Regiment was formed in 1926 as three engineer companies.

World War II
In 1940, 3 Field was mobilized for World War 2 and saw service in North Africa, where it participated in the desert campaign and the Battle of El Alamein. 3rd Field Company was attached to 1st S.A. Division and played an important part in the Division's first operation - the raid to capture El Wak - by ensuring water supplies. The Company served with distinction throughout the campaign in Ethiopia and Abyssinia. In one of the strangest of combined operations, No 1 Section was required to set bangalore torpedoes to blow up the outer and inner barbed wire entanglements protecting Fort Todenyang on the shore of Lake Rudolf.

By 1946 the unit was designated as 3 Field Squadron and along with 1 Field Squadron from Durban, 2 Field Squadron from Port Elizabeth and 8 Field Park Squadron from Cape Town, formed 2 Field Engineer Regiment.

Border War
By 1975, 3 Field was mobilised for service in South West Africa for Operation Savanah, and was in service until withdrawal in 1988.

Post 1994
Since 1994 the regiment maintained a small footprint due to financial restrictions. 3 Field still participates in Exercise Bailey each year.

3 Field celebrated its 80th anniversary in 2006.

Name Change
In August 2019, 52 Reserve Force units had their names changed to reflect the diverse military history of South Africa. 3 Field Engineer Regiment became the Ihawu Field Engineer Regiment, and have 3 years to design and implement new regimental insignia.

Insignia

Previous Insignia

Leadership

References

External links 

Engineer regiments of South Africa
Military units and formations in Cape Town
Military units and formations established in 1926